Wayne D. Angell (born June 28, 1930) is an American economist, politician and professor who served as a member of the Federal Reserve Board of Governors from 1986 to 1994.

Angell was born in Liberal, Kansas.

Biography
He graduated from Ottawa University, from the University of Kansas with an M.A. in 1953, and a Ph.D. in 1954. He taught at Ottawa University from 1959 to 1985. He was elected to the Kansas State House of Representatives, in 1960. He ran for the U.S. House of Representatives in 1966 and the U.S. Senate in 1978, losing in the Republican primaries to Larry Winn and Nancy Landon Kassebaum, respectively.

He served as the Governor of the Federal Reserve Board from 1986 to 1994. He left to become a Chief Economist and Senior Managing Director for Bear Sterns & Co., Inc., where he served until 2002.  He opened a consultancy, Angell Economics.

He is a frequent economics commentator on CNBC's "Kudlow & Company", "Fast Money", and has appeared on "Charlie Rose". A chair in economics has been named for him at Ottawa University.
He lives with his wife Betty Angell in Laguna Beach, California. They have four children and nine grandchildren.

References

External links
Federal Reserve Bank of Minneapolis
Ottawa University Alumni Association Outstanding Achievement Award
"Wayne Angell, and Jeremy Siegel", Kudlow & Company, Aug 25, 2009
Statements and Speeches of Wayne D. Angell

1930 births
California Republicans
Economists from Kansas
Economists from Virginia
Federal Reserve System governors
Kansas Republicans
Living people
Members of the Kansas House of Representatives
Ottawa University alumni
Ottawa University faculty
People from Arlington County, Virginia
People from Liberal, Kansas
University of Kansas alumni
Reagan administration personnel
George H. W. Bush administration personnel
Clinton administration personnel